2016–17 Belarusian Cup was the twenty sixth season of the Belarusian annual cup competition. Contrary to the league season, it is conducted in a fall-spring rhythm. The first matches were played on 11 June 2016. Winners of the Cup qualified for the second qualifying round of the 2017–18 UEFA Europa League.

Participating clubs 
The following teams took part in the competition:

First round
The first round was contested by 30 teams. Zvezda-BGU Minsk were given a bye to the second round by drawing of lots. The other 13 First League clubs, 13 Second League clubs and 4 amateur teams were drawn into 15 fixtures, with lower league club in each pair to play at home. The matches were played between 10 and 12 June 2016.

Round of 32
In this round 15 winners of the first round and Zvezda-BGU Minsk were drawn against 16 Premier League clubs. The matches will be played between 6 July and 14 September 2016.

Round of 16
In this round the 16 winners of the previous round were paired by an open draw. The draw was conducted on 27 July 2016. The matches will be played on 21 September 2016.

Quarter-finals
The draw was made on 22 September 2016. The matches were played in March 2017.

|}

First leg

Second leg

Semi-finals
The draw was made on 20 March 2017. The matches were played on 5 and 26 April 2017.

|}

First leg

Second leg

Final
The winners of the semifinals met on 28 May 2017 at the Neman Stadium in Grodno.

References

External links
 Football.by

2016–17 European domestic association football cups
Cup
Cup
2016-17